Prakash Jarwal is an Indian politician from the Aam Admi Party, currently representing Deoli constituency in the Delhi State Legislature.

About
Jarwal is the youngest candidate of Aam Aadmi Party, 25 years old. Jarwal has left his job of assistant manager in a multinational company, to join the anti-Corruption movement and later AAP. Jarwal has been jailed for an alleged assault on a Delhi Jal Board junior engineer.

On 21 July 2017, Jarwal was booked for molesting and harassing a woman who was allegedly a member of the Rashtravadi Janata Party.

On 20 February 2018, an assault case was filed by Delhi Chief Secretary Anshu Prakash against Jarwal and fellow legislator Amanatullah Khan for allegedly slapping and abusing him  at the residence of Chief Minister Arvind Kejriwal.  He was granted bail on 9 March. In 2021, a Delhi court dismissed the assault case filed by the Delhi bureaucrat against Kejriwal and ten AAP MLAs and discharged them of all charges. The court noted that "no prima facie case" was made against them.

On 18 April 2020, a 52-year-old doctor, Rajendra Singh, had allegedly committed suicide, holding Jarwal responsible in his suicide note following which police had registered a case against the legislator on charges of extortion and abetment to suicide.

Electoral performance

References 
 

Living people
Delhi MLAs 2013–2015
Delhi MLAs 2015–2020
Delhi MLAs 2020–2025
Year of birth missing (living people)
Aam Aadmi Party MLAs from Delhi